John Kestel is an Australian Paralympic athlete and archer. At the 1976 Toronto Games, he won a gold medal in the Mixed Pairs open dartchery event with Margaret Ross and a bronze medal in the Men's Javelin 2 event. In August 2000, before the arrival of the Olympic Torch for the 2000 Sydney Games, volunteers from the Scone area planted 2,000 trees in honour of four former Olympians or Paralympians, including Kestel, who were from the town.

References

Paralympic athletes of Australia
Paralympic dartchers of Australia
Athletes (track and field) at the 1976 Summer Paralympics
Dartchers at the 1976 Summer Paralympics
Medalists at the 1976 Summer Paralympics
Paralympic gold medalists for Australia
Paralympic bronze medalists for Australia
Paralympic medalists in athletics (track and field)
Paralympic medalists in dartchery
Australian male javelin throwers
Wheelchair javelin throwers
Paralympic javelin throwers
People from Upper Hunter Shire Council
Sportsmen from New South Wales
Year of birth missing (living people)
Living people